Anjaan is a 2014 Indian Tamil-language action film written and directed by N. Lingusamy and produced under his banner Thirupathi Brothers. The film stars Suriya and Vidyut Jammwal, while Samantha Ruth Prabhu, Manoj Bajpayee and Dalip Tahil appear in supporting characters. The film follows a disabled man who arrives in Mumbai looking for his gangster brother and learns of the events behind his disappearance.

Principal photography began on 20 November 2013, in Mumbai and Goa, and was completed in June 2014. The film's cinematography and editing were handled by Santosh Sivan and Anthony, respectively, while Yuvan Shankar Raja composed the soundtrack album and background score. The film was distributed by UTV Motion Pictures. Anjaan was released on 15 August 2014 and received mixed reviews from critics and audience.

Plot
Krishna is a disabled man, who arrives in Mumbai from Kanyakumari to find his brother Raju. A taxi driver named Raja drives him to a bar where he tries to inquire about Raju from the henchmen of Raju's former associate Amar, but is rebuffed. Raju's friend Rajiv tells him that Raju was a top gangster. Krishna then meets Raju's old enemy JK, who reveals Raju spared his life when he could've killed him. JK tells Krishna about Karim Bhai, a close friend of Raju. Upon meeting Karim, Krishna learns about Raju's past. 

Past: Raju and his brotherly friend Chandru are powerful gangsters to whom Karim himself is a personal friend, while Johnny, Rajiv, Jackie, Manoj and Amar are their henchmen. The new commissioner R. Ashok Kumar tries to get rid of them, but Raju kidnaps Ashok's daughter Jeeva on the night of her marriage, in exchange for freeing his men. The commissioner is forced to agree, but Jeeva explains that she didn't want to get married and her kidnapping is also her consent. Soon, the two fall for each other. Raju and Chandru meets a powerful crime boss named Imran Bhai from Dubai, who insults and warns them instead. 

Chandru takes the insult seriously and stays awake all night, but becomes delighted upon finding that Raju kidnapped him at the party itself. The duo meets Imran at a spot where he was held captive by Rajiv and have their verbal revenge. Delighted, Chandru gifts a brand new car to Raju, who later finds Jeeva inside where Chandru tells Raju to enjoy the vacation with Jeeva. During their vacation, Raju and Jeeva are attacked, but they manages to escape. Returning to his hood, Raju is shattered to find Chandru's mutilated corpse, and in a fit of rage, orders Amar to accompany him in killing Imran. However, Raju is betrayed by Amar, who shoots him, throwing him into the water. 

Present: Krishna is told by Karim to stay hidden when Amar arrives at his taxi station, but is spotted and reveals that he killed Raju. Amar orders his henchmen to kill Krishna, but Krishna, who is revealed to be Raju, fights off everyone and shoots Amar dead. He tells Karim that he intends to stay as Krishna unless his mission to hunt down the traitors is accomplished, and stays at Karim's home. Karim tells that Chandru was supposed to meet J.K on the day he died and Jackie didn't tag along. Raju finds Jackie at a horse race stadium and chases after him, making him to reveal that he tried to contact Raju (who was on vacation) and Chandru, but Chandru's call was answered by Johnny. Suspecting a mishap, Jackie escaped. Raju catches Johnny using the latter's girlfriend Sindhu.

Past: On the day of the meeting between Chandru and J.K., Imran and his henchmen arrive instead of J.K. Chandru fights them off, but is held by Johnny, Amar and Manoj (who were bribed by Imran) where he is stabbed to death. Raju calls Chandru to ask about his safety, but was answered by Amar, who lied about him being in a meeting.

Present: Learning the truth, Raju kills Johnny and proceeds to kill Manoj along with his henchmen in an ensuing fight. Raju tries to kill Imran at his birthday party but ends up shooting only his virtual projection telecast from Dubai. Raju and Karim learn that Imran's henchmen arrived at the latter's house and kidnap Saira, but Karim reveals that it was Jeeva, who was kidnapped and not Saira, Jeeva wanted to stay away as well as keep in touch with Raju by wearing a burqa. Raju goes to the spot and fights off all the henchmen and rescues Jeeva, only to be captured and brought to Imran by his henchmen, who then betray him by helping Raju kill Imran and fatally stabs Imran avenging Chandru's death. Raju leaves, but shoots the henchmen, believing that even enemies must not have traitors. Before leaving Mumbai, Raju and Jeeva meet Raja, who is shocked to learn it was Raju all along.

Cast

 Suriya as Krishna/Raju Bhai
 Vidyut Jammwal as Chandru Bhai, Raju's best friend and partner, who later gets killed by Imran Bhai.
 Samantha Ruth Prabhu as Jeeva, Raju's girlfriend and Commissioner's Daughter. (voiceover by M. M. Manasi)
 Manoj Bajpayee as Imran Bhai, the main antagonist who kills Chandru. (voiceover by Chetan)
 Dalip Tahil as JK, Raju's enemy.
 Soori Muthuchamy as Raja, a taxi driver who helps Krishna
 Joe Malloori as Karim Bhai, Chandru and Raju's close friend and a Taxi Driver.
 Murali Sharma as Johnny, henchman.
 Asif Basra as Rajiv, henchman.
 Chetan Hansraj as Manoj, Raju's henchman who betrayed Chandru and works for Imran Bhai
 Bikramjeet Kanwarpal as Commissioner R. Ashok Kumar, Jeeva's father.
 Manoj Mishra as Jackie, henchman.
 Bobby Bedi as Amar, Raju's former associate.
 Sanjana Singh as Sindhu
 Manobala as Director
 Pradeep Kabra as a local goon
 Brahmanandam as Guru Shastri, the head of the musical troupe. 
 Rajeevan as himself (cameo appearance)
 Chitrangada Singh as a bar dancer (item number in the song Sirippu En)
 Maryam Zakaria as a bar dancer (item number in song Bang Bang Bang)

Production

Development
In July 2012, it was reported first that Suriya had signed on Lingusamy's film to be produced under the director's banner and that he would work on it after Maattrraan (2012) and Hari's Singam 2 (2013). After the completion of both movies, the actor was reported to work simultaneously with Lingusamy and director Gautham Vasudev Menon for a film titled Dhruva Natchathiram. Suriya waited for six months after Singam 2, but failed to receive a complete script from Gautham Menon and no progress took place in this period of time. Owing to this reason, he opted out of Gautham's film in October 2013 and announced that he would soon start work on Lingusamy's film. The director confirmed the news and also stated the film would officially start filming from mid-November 2013. It was said that the script had been modified a few times. The film was started without a title. In January 2014, the title was officially announced to be Anjaan. Vijay Milton was initially signed by Lingusamy as the cinematographer for the film, but in October 2013 he was replaced with Santosh Sivan, collaborating with Lingusamy for the first time. The film's editing was reported to be handled by Anthony while Rajeevan was recruited as the art director. Brinda Sarathy was confirmed to be the dialogue writer for the film.

Casting
In early November 2013, Manoj Bajpai was reported to be playing the film's antagonist while Vidyut Jamwal would also appear in a prominent role. Dalip Tahil was signed on for the role of a small, but powerful don in the film. In January 2014, actress Samantha Ruth Prabhu was added to the cast. Comedian Vivek was approached to play a role in the film, but could not take up the offer as a result of date clashes with Vai Raja Vai. Instead in March 2014, another comedian Soori was signed. Sana Khan was approached to do a special number in the film but she declined the offer as she wanted to promote her Bollywood film Jai Ho (2014). Actress Maryam Zakaria was chosen to do an item number in the film. Chitrangada Singh was chosen for another item number after discussions to have Sonakshi Sinha and later, Kareena Kapoor, in the song were unsuccessful.

Filming

In mid-October 2013, a test shoot occurred with Suriya and Malavika Rampradeep, a Bharatanatyam dancer, with the Red Dragon 6K Digital camera along with a high zoom lens. It was reported that it was the first film in the world to be shot with the camera. The technology had not even been used in Hollywood films, according to the makers. Suriya was said to possess two different appearances for filming, starting with a raw and jagged look, whereas, his other look was not yet revealed and that it was kept as a surprise for his fans in the movie. Filming started on 20 November 2013 in Mumbai. A few days before it began, Suriya completed a photo-shoot of the film which was done by still photographer Venkatram. The lead actors were shooting in Mumbai, but came back to Chennai before the one-month schedule. In December 2013 the intro song was filmed with Suriya, Vidyut Jamwal and Maryam Zakaria. The song was shot in a set, worth , that had been erected in Borivali in Mumbai. The first schedule was wrapped in early January 2014. In early February 2014, the crew was shooting for a song sequence in Panchgani. The third schedule started on 5 March 2014 in Mumbai. An item number featuring Manoj Bajpai and Chitrangada Singh was shot in March 2014. The song written by Na. Muthukumar was shot in June 2014 at the Morjim and Miramar beaches of Goa during the final schedule of 10 days.

While shooting for the film in Goa, Suriya injured his knee during a stunt sequence. Lingusamy stated that the actor suffered a minor ligament tear when a fighter who weighed about 120 kg fell from a height on his leg. The entire unit panicked when the incident happened, but the actor wasn't fluttered. The director clarified that Suriya would be fit and fine soon and that he took a short break from shooting.

Music

The soundtrack and the score for the film were composed by Yuvan Shankar Raja, making Anjaan the fourth collaboration between the composer and director Lingusamy. The soundtrack album features five tracks, written by Viveka, Na. Muthukumar, Kabilan and Madhan Karky. The album was released on 30 July 2014 with positive reviews. The male portion of one of the songs, "Ek Do Theen", was sung by Suriya and became his first attempt at playback singing.

Remake 
The film was unofficially remade into Bengali in 2018 as Captain Khan.

Release

Theatrical

The film had its premiere at Kuala Lumpur, Malaysia, on 14 August 2014, a day before the actual release.

To counter unauthorized copying, the owners decided that the film would release only through digital screens and no physical print was allowed for screening it anywhere. Since the film was shot with 6K resolution, physical prints offered no additional quality anyway. The makers wanted only digital projection of Anjaan, enabling its makers to easily find the sources of leaks through identifying codes. As a result of this initiative, Anjaan became the first Indian film which had a 100% digital release.

Marketing
The first look posters of the film were released on 1 May 2014. The teaser trailer of the film was launched along with the teaser of Kamal Haasan starrer Uttama Villain during the 8th Vijay Awards held on 6 July 2014 and was simultaneously uploaded to YouTube. The teaser received positive response and crossed 3 million views. Indiaglitz in its review of the teaser said, "One could see the monotony which features in all the gangster flicks, but that has been easily shadowed by the power packed cast and crew". The official trailer of the film was released on 8 August 2014 and aired on Sun Music. The trailer too received positive response and also crossed 1 million views. Behindwoods wrote in its trailer review, "Lingusamy is eyeing another blockbuster here." Indiaglitz in its review, summarised, "Overall, the trailer lives up to the expectation and it is up to the movie now." The video clip of the track "Ek Do Theen", featuring Suriya and Samantha Ruth Prabhu was released on YouTube on 10 August 2014.

The official game titled Anjaan Race Wars was developed by Vroovy, a joint venture between Hungama Digital Media Entertainment and Gameshastra, who had previously developed and released the official movie games of Kochadaiiyaan (2014). It released on 28 July 2014. The game play revolved around Suriya chasing the goons in a car. The features of the game included two types of AI – One of them shooting and the other ones try to run away, 5 different cars, including Hummer, featured in the game. Power-ups included Nitro, Fuel, Ammo, Instant repair and Shield, while the weapons included Pistol and Shotgun. The game is available on Android and iOS operating systems.

Lingusamy and Suriya went to promote the film in Kochi. Two days before the film's release, Samantha and Lingusamy promoted the film at The Forum Vijaya Mall in Chennai. The entire crew of the film, including Suriya, Vidyut Jamwal, Lingusamy, Brinda Sarathy and Yuvan Shankar Raja, attended the premiere of the film at Kuala Lumpur.

Home media

Reception

Box office
Anjaan collected  from Tamil Nadu, Kerala, Karnataka regions on its first day, where the Telugu version Sikandar collected  on its first day. International Business Times described the film's financial performance as average.

Critical response

Anjaan opened to mixed reviews from critics and audience with praise for Suriya's performance, action sequences and musical score, but criticism directed towards the plot and runtime.

Deccan Chronicle rated three and a half out of five and said "It's Suriya's show all the way." Sify rated three out of five and wrote, "On the whole, Anjaan is for those who seek unabashed entertainment and relish masala films." M. Suganth of The Times of India gave two out of five and wrote, "When a film announces loud and clear, all that it wants to do is be in service of its hero, and make him as larger than life as possible, we accept it, and all that we expect from it is to entertain us. But when it takes almost three hours to narrate its story with predictable twists and underwritten characters in a non-engaging fashion." IANS wrote, "It is high time Lingusamy, who is reluctant to change, accepts the fact that age-old formula doesn't work anymore.", and rated the film three out of five. Indiaglitz wrote, "A commercial entertainer that might not go beyond Suriya's fan base!", and gave the movie two and a half out of five. Behindwoods rated the film two out of five and concluded, "Suriya and Anjaan, [is] let down by the screenplay!". Ramchander of OneIndia gave two and a half out of five and wrote, "Surya's Anjaan is lengthy, and it is just an average movie in the end." Baradwaj Rangan of The Hindu wrote, " It runs a posterior-numbing 170 minutes, and there isn’t one surprising moment — not one line of dialogue worth recalling, not one tune worth humming, not one action sequence worth upping the pulse for (they borrowed the doves from the John Woo films, but none of the moves), not one juicy character worth caring about. ".

References

External links
 

2014 films
2014 action thriller films
2014 crime action films
Films shot in Mumbai
India-exclusive video games
Indian action thriller films
Indian crime action films
Films shot in Goa
Indian films about revenge
2010s Tamil-language films
Films scored by Yuvan Shankar Raja
Films directed by N. Lingusamy
UTV Motion Pictures films
Films set in Mumbai
Fictional portrayals of the Maharashtra Police
Tamil films remade in other languages